James Edgar Cain, Jr. (October 1, 1927 – October 5, 2001) was an American football defensive end who played five seasons in the National Football League with the Chicago Cardinals and Detroit Lions. He was drafted by the Chicago Cardinals in the seventh round of the 1949 NFL Draft. He played college football at the University of Alabama and attended Eudora High School in Eudora, Arkansas. Cain was also a member of the Calgary Stampeders Canadian Football League.

References

External links
Just Sports Stats

1927 births
2001 deaths
Players of American football from Arkansas
American football defensive ends
Canadian football defensive linemen
American players of Canadian football
Alabama Crimson Tide football players
Chicago Cardinals players
Detroit Lions players
Calgary Stampeders players
People from Chicot County, Arkansas